Malawi (or [maláwi]; Tumbuka: Malaŵi), officially the Republic of Malawi, is a landlocked country in Southeastern Africa that was formerly known as Nyasaland. It is bordered by Zambia to the west, Tanzania to the north and northeast, and Mozambique to the east, south and southwest. Malawi's capital (and largest city) is Lilongwe. Its second-largest is Blantyre, its third-largest is Mzuzu and its fourth-largest is its former capital, Zomba. The name Malawi comes from the Maravi, an old name for the Chewa people who inhabit the area. The country is nicknamed "The Warm Heart of Africa" because of the friendliness of its people.

The part of Africa now known as Malawi was settled around the 10th century by migrating Bantu groups. Centuries later, in 1891, the area was colonised by the British and became a protectorate of the United Kingdom known as Nyasaland. In 1953, it became a protectorate within the semi-independent Federation of Rhodesia and Nyasaland. The Federation was dissolved in 1963. In 1964, the protectorate was ended: Nyasaland became an independent country under Queen Elizabeth II, and was renamed Malawi. Two years later it became a republic. It gained full independence from the United Kingdom, and by 1970 had become a totalitarian one-party state under the presidency of Hastings Banda, who remained in this role until 1994. Today, Malawi has a democratic, multi-party republic headed by an elected president. Lazarus Chakwera of the Malawi Congress Party led the Tonse Alliance grouping of nine political parties and won the court-mandated Presidential Election rerun held on 23 June 2020 after the May 2019 Presidential Election was annulled due to massive electoral irregularities. The country's military, the Malawian Defence Force, includes an army, a navy, and an air wing. Malawi's foreign policy is pro-Western. It maintains positive diplomatic relations with most countries, and participates in several international organisations, including the United Nations, the Commonwealth of Nations, the Southern African Development Community (SADC), the Common Market for Eastern and Southern Africa (COMESA), and the African Union (AU).

Malawi is one of the world's least-developed countries. The economy is heavily based on agriculture, and it has a largely rural and rapidly growing population. The Malawian government depends heavily on outside aid to meet its development needs, although the amount needed (and the aid offered) has decreased since 2000. The Malawian government faces challenges in its efforts to build and expand the economy, to improve education, healthcare, and environmental protection, and to become financially independent despite widespread unemployment. Since 2005, Malawi has developed several policies that focus on addressing these issues, and the country's outlook appears to be improving: Key indicators of progress in the economy, education, and healthcare were seen in 2007 and 2008.

Malawi has a low life expectancy and high infant mortality. HIV/AIDS is highly prevalent, which both reduces the labour force and requires increased government expenditures. The country has a diverse population that includes native peoples, Asians, and Europeans. Several languages are spoken, and there is an array of religious beliefs. Although in the past there was a periodic regional conflict fuelled in part by ethnic divisions, by 2008 this internal conflict had considerably diminished, and the idea of identifying with one's Malawian nationality had reemerged.

History

Pre-colonial history

The area of Africa now known as Malawi had a very small population of hunter-gatherers before waves of Bantu peoples began emigrating from the north around the 10th century. Although most of the Bantu peoples continued south, some remained and founded ethnic groups based on common ancestry. By 1500 AD, the tribes had established the Kingdom of Maravi that reached from north of what is now Nkhotakota to the Zambezi River and from Lake Malawi to the Luangwa River in what is now Zambia.

Soon after 1600, with the area mostly united under one native ruler, native tribesmen began encountering, trading with and making alliances with Portuguese traders and members of the military. By 1700, however, the empire had broken up into areas controlled by many individual ethnic groups. The Indian Ocean slave trade reached its height in the mid-1800s, when approximately 20,000 people were enslaved and considered to be carried yearly from Nkhotakota to Kilwa where they were sold.

Colonial occupation
Missionary and explorer David Livingstone reached Lake Malawi (then Lake Nyasa) in 1859 and identified the Shire Highlands south of the lake as an area suitable for European settlement. As the result of Livingstone's visit, several Anglican and Presbyterian missions were established in the area in the 1860s and 1870s, the African Lakes Company Limited was established in 1878 to set up a trade and transport concern working closely with the missions, and a small mission and trading settlement were established at Blantyre in 1876 and a British Consul took up residence there in 1883. The Portuguese government was also interested in the area so, to prevent Portuguese occupation, the British government sent Harry Johnston as British consul with instructions to make treaties with local rulers beyond Portuguese jurisdiction.

In 1889, a British protectorate was proclaimed over the Shire Highlands, which was extended in 1891 to include the whole of present-day Malawi as the British Central Africa Protectorate. In 1907, the protectorate was renamed Nyasaland, a name it retained for the remainder of its time under British rule. In a prime example of what is sometimes called the "Thin White Line" of colonial authority in Africa, the colonial government of Nyasaland was formed in 1891. The administrators were given a budget of £10,000 (1891 nominal value) per year, which was enough to employ ten European civilians, two military officers, seventy Punjabi Sikhs and eighty-five Zanzibar porters. These few employees were then expected to administer and police a territory of around 94,000 square kilometers with between one and two million people.

That same year, slavery came to its complete cessation when Sir Harry Johnston, the Commissioner of Nyasaland made his significant effort to put an end to the trade.

In 1944, the Nyasaland African Congress (NAC) was formed by the Africans of Nyasaland to promote local interests to the British government. In 1953, Britain linked Nyasaland with Northern and Southern Rhodesia in what was the Federation of Rhodesia and Nyasaland, often called the Central African Federation (CAF), for mainly political reasons. Even though the Federation was semi-independent, the linking provoked opposition from African nationalists, and the NAC gained popular support. An influential opponent of the CAF was Hastings Banda, a European-trained doctor working in Ghana who was persuaded to return to Nyasaland in 1958 to assist the nationalist cause. Banda was elected president of the NAC and worked to mobilise nationalist sentiment before being jailed by colonial authorities in 1959. He was released in 1960 and asked to help draft a new constitution for Nyasaland, with a clause granting Africans the majority in the colony's Legislative Council.

Hastings Kamuzu Banda era (1961–1993) 

In 1961, Banda's Malawi Congress Party (MCP) gained a majority in the Legislative Council elections and Banda became Prime Minister in 1963. The Federation was dissolved in 1963, and on 6 July 1964, Nyasaland became independent from British rule and renamed itself Malawi, and that is commemorated as the nation's Independence Day, a public holiday. Under a new constitution, Malawi became a republic with Banda as its first president. The new document also formally made Malawi a one-party state with the MCP as the only legal party. In 1971, Banda was declared president-for-life. For almost 30 years, Banda presided over a rigidly totalitarian regime, which ensured that Malawi did not suffer armed conflict. Opposition parties, including the Malawi Freedom Movement of Orton Chirwa and the Socialist League of Malawi, were founded in exile.

Malawi's economy, while Banda was president, was often cited as an example of how a poor, landlocked, and heavily populated country deficient in mineral resources could achieve progress in both agriculture and industrial development. While in office, and using his control of the country, Banda constructed a business empire that eventually produced one-third of the country's GDP and employed 10% of the wage-earning workforce.

Multi-party democracy (1993–present) 

Under pressure for increased political freedom, Banda agreed to a referendum in 1993, where the populace voted for a multi-party democracy. In late 1993, a presidential council was formed, the life presidency was abolished and a new constitution was put into place, effectively ending the MCP's rule. In 1994 the first multi-party elections were held in Malawi, and Banda was defeated by Bakili Muluzi (a former Secretary General of the MCP and former Banda Cabinet Minister). Re-elected in 1999, Muluzi remained president until 2004, when Bingu wa Mutharika was elected. Although the political environment was described as "challenging", it was stated in 2009 that a multi-party system still existed in Malawi. Multiparty parliamentary and presidential elections were held for the fourth time in Malawi in May 2009, and President Mutharika was successfully re-elected, despite charges of election fraud from his rival.

President Mutharika was seen by some as increasingly autocratic and dismissive of human rights, and in July 2011 protests over high costs of living, devolving foreign relations, poor governance and a lack of foreign exchange reserves erupted. The protests left 18 people dead and at least 44 others suffering from gunshot wounds.

In April 2012, Mutharika died of a heart attack. Over a period of 48 hours, his death was kept secret, including an elaborate flight with the body to South Africa, where the ambulance drivers refused to move the body, saying they were not licensed to move a corpse. After the South African government threatened to reveal the information, the presidential title was taken over by Vice-President Joyce Banda (not related to the former president Banda).

In 2014 Malawian general election Joyce Banda lost the elections (coming third) and was replaced by Peter Mutharika, the brother of ex-President Mutharika. In the 2019 Malawian general election president Peter Mutharika was narrowly re-elected. In February 2020 Malawi Constitutional Court overturned the result because of irregularities and widespread fraud. In May 2020 Malawi Supreme Court upheld the decision and announced a new election was held on July 2. This was the first time an election in the country was legally challenged. Opposition leader Lazarus Chakwera won the 2020 Malawian presidential election and he was sworn in as the new president of Malawi.

Government and politics

Malawi is a unitary presidential republic under the leadership of President Lazarus Chakwera The current constitution was put into place on 18 May 1995. The branches of the government consist of executive, legislative and judicial. The executive includes a President who is both Head of State and Head of Government, first and second Vice Presidents and the Cabinet of Malawi. The President and Vice President are elected together every five years. A second Vice President may be appointed by the President if so chosen, although they must be from a different party. The members of the Cabinet of Malawi are appointed by the President and can be from either inside or outside of the legislature.

The legislative branch consists of a unicameral National Assembly of 193 members who are elected every five years, and although the Malawian constitution provides for a Senate of 80 seats, one does not exist in practice. If created, the Senate would provide representation for traditional leaders and a variety of geographic districts, as well as special interest groups including the disabled, youth, and women. The Malawi Congress Party is the ruling party together with several other parties in the Tonse Alliance led by Lazarus Chakwera while the Democratic Progressive Party is the main opposition party. Suffrage is universal at 18 years of age, and the central government budget for 2021/2022 is $2.4 billion from $2.8 billion for the 2020/2021 financial year.

The independent judicial branch is based upon the English model and consists of a Supreme Court of Appeal, a High Court divided into three sections (general, constitutional, and commercial), an Industrial Relations Court and Magistrates Courts, the last of which is divided into five grades and includes Child Justice Courts. The judicial system has been changed several times since Malawi gained independence in 1964. Conventional courts and traditional courts have been used in varying combinations, with varying degrees of success and corruption.

Malawi is composed of three regions (the Northern, Central, and Southern regions), which are divided into 28 districts, and further into approximately 250 traditional authorities and 110 administrative wards. Local government is administered by central government-appointed regional administrators and district commissioners. For the first time in the multi-party era, local elections took place on 21 November 2000, with the UDF party winning 70% of the available seats. There was scheduled to be a second round of constitutionally mandated local elections in May 2005, but these were cancelled by the government.

In February 2005, President Mutharika split with the United Democratic Front and began his own party, the Democratic Progressive Party, which had attracted reform-minded officials from other parties and won by-elections across the country in 2006. In 2008, President Mutharika had implemented reforms to address the country's major corruption problem, with at least five senior UDF party members facing criminal charges. In 2012, Malawi was ranked 7th of all countries in sub-Saharan Africa in the Ibrahim Index of African Governance, an index that measures several variables to provide a comprehensive view of the governance of African countries. Although the country's governance score was higher than the continental average, it was lower than the regional average for southern Africa. Its highest scores were for safety and rule of law, and its lowest scores were for sustainable economic opportunity, with a ranking of 47th on the continent for educational opportunities. Malawi's governance score had improved between 2000 and 2011. Malawi held elections in May 2019, with President Peter Mutharika winning re-election over challengers Lazarus Chakwera, Atupele Muluzi, and Saulos Chilima. In 2020 Malawi Constitutional Court annulled President Peter Mutharika's narrow election victory last year because of widespread fraud and irregularities. Opposition leader Lazarus Chakwera won 2020 Malawian presidential election and he became the new president.

Administrative divisions

Malawi is divided into 28 districts within three regions:

Foreign relations

Former President Hastings Banda established a pro-Western foreign policy that continued into early 2011. It included good diplomatic relationships with many Western countries. The transition from a one-party state to a multi-party democracy strengthened Malawian ties with the United States. Significant numbers of students from Malawi travel to the US for schooling, and the US has active branches of the Peace Corps, the Centers for Disease Control and Prevention, the Department of Health and Human Services and the Agency for International Development in Malawi. Malawi maintained close relations with South Africa throughout the Apartheid era, which strained Malawi's relationships with other African countries. Following the collapse of apartheid in 1994, diplomatic relationships were made and maintained into 2011 between Malawi and all other African countries. In 2010, however, Malawi's relationship with Mozambique became strained, partially due to disputes over the use of the Zambezi River and an inter-country electrical grid. In 2007, Malawi established diplomatic ties with China, and Chinese investment in the country has continued to increase since then, despite concerns regarding the treatment of workers by Chinese companies and competition of Chinese business with local companies. In 2011, relations between Malawi and the United Kingdom were damaged when a document was released in which the British ambassador to Malawi criticised President Mutharika. Mutharika expelled the ambassador from Malawi, and in July 2011, the UK announced that it was suspending all budgetary aid because of Mutharika's lack of response to criticisms of his government and economic mismanagement. On 26 July 2011, the United States followed suit, freezing a US$350 million grant, citing concerns regarding the government's suppression and intimidation of demonstrators and civic groups, as well as restriction of the press and police violence.

Malawi has been seen as a haven for refugees from other African countries, including Mozambique and Rwanda, since 1985. These influxes of refugees have placed a strain on the Malawian economy but have also drawn significant inflows of aid from other countries. Donors to Malawi include the United States, Canada, Germany, Iceland, Japan, the Netherlands, Norway, Sweden, Ireland, the UK and Flanders (Belgium), as well as international institutions such as the World Bank, the International Monetary Fund, the European Union, the African Development Bank and UN organizations.

Malawi is a member of several international organizations including the Commonwealth, the UN and some of its child agencies, the IMF, the World Bank, the African Union and the World Health Organization. Malawi tends to view economic and political stability in southern Africa as a necessity and advocates peaceful solutions through negotiation. The country was the first in southern Africa to receive peacekeeping training under the African Crisis Response Initiative.

In October 2022, a memorandum of understanding was signed with Liberland, which caused public critics in the country.

Human rights

, international observers noted issues in several human rights areas. Excessive force was seen to be used by police forces, security forces were able to act with impunity, mob violence was occasionally seen, and prison conditions continued to be harsh and sometimes life-threatening. However, the government was seen to make some effort to prosecute security forces who used excessive force. Other legal issues included limits on free speech and freedom of the press, lengthy pretrial detentions, and arbitrary arrests and detentions. Societal issues found included violence against women, human trafficking, and child labour. Corruption within the government is seen as a major issue, despite the Malawi Anti-Corruption Bureau's (ACB) attempts to reduce it. The ACB appears to be successful at finding and prosecuting low level corruption, but higher level officials appear to be able to act with impunity. Corruption within security forces is also an issue. Malawi had one of the highest rates of child marriage in the world. In 2015 Malawi raised the legal age for marriage from 15 to 18. Other issues that have been raised are lack of adequate legal protection of women from sexual abuse and harassment, very high maternal mortality rate, and abuse related to accusations of witchcraft.

, homosexuality has been illegal in Malawi. In one 2010 case, a couple perceived as homosexual faced extensive jail time when convicted. The convicted pair, sentenced to the maximum of 14 years of hard labour each, were pardoned two weeks later following the intervention of United Nations Secretary General Ban Ki-moon. In May 2012, then-President Joyce Banda pledged to repeal laws criminalising homosexuality. It was her successor, Peter Mutharika, who imposed a moratorium in 2015 that suspended the country's anti-gay laws pending further review of the same laws. On 26 June 2021, the country's LGBT community held the first Pride parade in the country's Capital City, Lilongwe.

Geography

Malawi is a landlocked country in southeastern Africa, bordered by Zambia to the northwest, Tanzania to the northeast, and Mozambique to the south, southwest, and southeast. It lies between latitudes 9° and 18°S, and longitudes 32° and 36°E.

The Great Rift Valley runs through the country from north to south, and to the east of the valley lies Lake Malawi (also called Lake Nyasa), making up over three-quarters of Malawi's eastern boundary. The Shire River flows from the south end of the lake and joins the Zambezi River  farther south in Mozambique.

Malawi's capital is Lilongwe, and its commercial centre is Blantyre with a population of over 500,000 people. Malawi has two sites listed on the UNESCO World Heritage List. Lake Malawi National Park was first listed in 1984 and the Chongoni Rock Art Area was listed in 2006.

Malawi's climate is hot in the low-lying areas in the south of the country and temperate in the northern highlands. The altitude moderates what would otherwise be an equatorial climate. Between November and April, the temperature is warm with equatorial rains and thunderstorms, with the storms reaching their peak severity in late March. After March, the rainfall rapidly diminishes, and from May to September wet mists float from the highlands into the plateaus, with almost no rainfall during these months.

Flora and fauna

Animal life indigenous to Malawi includes mammals such as elephants, hippos, antelopes, buffaloes, big cats, monkeys, rhinos, and bats; a great variety of birds including birds of prey, parrots and falcons, waterfowl and large waders, owls and songbirds. Lake Malawi has been described as having one of the richest lake fish faunas in the world, being the home for some 200 mammals, 650 birds, 30+ mollusk, and 5,500+ plant species.

Seven terrestrial ecoregions lie within Malawi's borders: Central Zambezian miombo woodlands, Eastern miombo woodlands, Southern miombo woodlands, Zambezian and mopane woodlands, Zambezian flooded grasslands, South Malawi montane forest-grassland mosaic, and Southern Rift montane forest-grassland mosaic.

There are five national parks, four wildlife and game reserves and two other protected areas in Malawi. The country had a 2019 Forest Landscape Integrity Index mean score of 5.74/10, ranking it 96th globally out of 172 countries.

Economy

Malawi is among the world's least developed countries. Around 85% of the population lives in rural areas. The economy is based on agriculture, and more than one-third of GDP and 90% of export revenues come from this. In the past, the economy has been dependent on substantial economic aid from the World Bank, the International Monetary Fund (IMF), and other countries. Malawi was ranked the 119th safest investment destination in the world in the March 2011 Euromoney Country Risk rankings.

In December 2000, the IMF stopped aid disbursements due to corruption concerns, and many individual donors followed, resulting in an almost 80% drop in Malawi's development budget. However, in 2005, Malawi was the recipient of over US$575 million in aid. The Malawian government faces challenges in developing a market economy, improving environmental protection, dealing with the rapidly growing HIV/AIDS problem, improving the education system, and satisfying its foreign donors that it is working to become financially independent. Improved financial discipline had been seen since 2005 under the leadership of President Mutharika and Financial Minister Gondwe. This discipline has since evaporated as shown by the purchase in 2009 of a private presidential jet followed almost immediately by a nationwide fuel shortage which was officially blamed on logistical problems but was more likely due to the hard currency shortage caused by the jet purchase. The overall cost to the economy (and healthcare system) is unknown.

In addition, some setbacks have been experienced, and Malawi has lost some of its ability to pay for imports due to a general shortage of foreign exchange, as investment fell 23% in 2009. There are many investment barriers in Malawi, which the government has failed to address, including high service costs and poor infrastructure for power, water, and telecommunications. , it was estimated that Malawi had a GDP (purchasing power parity) of $22.42 billion, with a per capita GDP of $1200, and inflation estimated at 12.2% in 2017.

Agriculture accounts for 35% of GDP, industry for 19% and services for the remaining 46%. Malawi has one of the lowest per capita incomes in the world, although economic growth was estimated at 9.7% in 2008 and strong growth is predicted by the International Monetary Fund for 2009. The poverty rate in Malawi is decreasing through the work of the government and supporting organisations, with people living under the poverty line decreasing from 54% in 1990 to 40% in 2006, and the percentage of "ultra-poor" decreasing from 24% in 1990 to 15% in 2007.

Many analysts believe that economic progress for Malawi depends on its ability to control population growth.

In January 2015 southern Malawi was devastated by the worst floods in living memory, stranding at least 20,000 people. These floods affected more than a million people across the country, including 336,000 who were displaced, according to UNICEF. Over 100 people were killed and an estimated 64,000 hectares of cropland were washed away.

Agriculture and industry

The economy of Malawi is predominantly agricultural. Over 80% of the population is engaged in subsistence farming, even though agriculture only contributed to 27% of GDP in 2013. The services sector accounts for more than half of GDP (54%), compared to 11% for manufacturing and 8% for other industries, including natural uranium mining. Malawi invests more in agriculture (as a share of GDP) than any other African country: 28% of GDP.

The main agricultural products of Malawi include tobacco, sugarcane, cotton, tea, corn, potatoes, sorghum, cattle and goats. The main industries are tobacco, tea and sugar processing, sawmill products, cement and consumer goods. The industrial production growth rate is estimated at 10% (2009). The country makes no significant use of natural gas. , Malawi does not import or export any electricity, but does import all its petroleum, with no production in country. Beginning in 2006, the country began mixing unleaded petrol with 10% ethanol, produced in-country at two plants, to reduce dependence on imported fuel. In 2008, Malawi began testing cars that ran solely on ethanol, and initial results are promising, and the country is continuing to increase its use of ethanol.

, Malawi exports an estimated US$945 million in goods per year. The country's strong reliance on tobacco places a heavy burden on the economy as world prices decline and the international community increases pressure to limit tobacco production. Malawi's dependence on tobacco is growing, with the product jumping from 53% to 70% of export revenues between 2007 and 2008. The country also relies heavily on tea, sugar, and coffee, with these three plus tobacco making up more than 90% of Malawi's export revenue. Because of a rise in costs and a decline in sales prices, Malawi is encouraging farmers away from tobacco towards more profitable crops, including spices such as paprika. The move away from tobacco is further fueled by likely World Health Organisation moves against the particular type of tobacco that Malawi produces, burley leaf. It is seen to be more harmful to human health than other tobacco products. India hemp is another possible alternative, but arguments have been made that it will bring more crime to the country through its resemblance to varieties of cannabis used as a recreational drug and the difficulty in distinguishing between the two types. This concern is especially important because the cultivation of Malawian cannabis, known as Malawi Gold, as a drug has increased significantly. Malawi is known for growing "the best and finest" cannabis in the world for recreational drug use, according to a recent World Bank report, and cultivation and sales of the crop may contribute to corruption within the police force.

Other exported goods are cotton, peanuts, wood products, and apparel. The main destination locations for the country's exports are South Africa, Germany, Egypt, Zimbabwe, the United States, Russia, and the Netherlands. Malawi currently imports an estimated US$1.625 billion in goods per year, with the main commodities being food, petroleum products, consumer goods, and transportation equipment. The main countries that Malawi imports from are South Africa, India, Zambia, Tanzania, the US, and China.

In 2006, in response to disastrously low agricultural harvests, Malawi began a programme of fertilizer subsidies, the Fertiliser Input Subsidy Programme (FISP) that was designed to re-energise the land and boost crop production. It has been reported that this programme, championed by the country's president, is radically improving Malawi's agriculture, and causing Malawi to become a net exporter of food to nearby countries. The FISP fertiliser subsidy programmes ended with President Mutharika's death; the country quickly faced food shortages again, and farmers developed reluctance to purchase fertilisers and other agricultural inputs on the open markets that remained.

In 2016, Malawi was hit by a drought, and in January 2017, the country reported an outbreak of armyworms around Zomba. The moth is capable of wiping out entire fields of corn, the staple grain of impoverished residents. On 14 January 2017, the agriculture minister George Chaponda reported that 2,000 hectares of crop had been destroyed, having spread to nine of twenty-eight districts.

Infrastructure

, Malawi has 31 airports, seven with paved runways (two international airports) and 24 with unpaved runways. , the country has  of railways, all narrow-gauge, and, as of 2003,  of roadways in various conditions,  paved and  unpaved. Malawi also has  of waterways on Lake Malawi and along the Shire River.

, there were 10.23 million mobile phone connections in Malawi. There were 4.03 million Internet users in 2022 (Datareportal). Also,  there was one government-run radio station (Malawi Broadcasting Corporation) and approximately a dozen more owned by private enterprises.

Radio, television and postal services in Malawi are regulated by the Malawi Communications Regulatory Authority (MACRA). Malawi television is improving. The country boasts 20 television stations by 2016 broadcasting on the country's digital network MDBNL e.g.[3] This includes Times Group, Timveni, Adventist, and Beta, Zodiak and CFC. In the past, Malawi's telecommunications system has been named as some of the poorest in Africa, but conditions are improving, with 130,000 land line telephones being connected between 2000 and 2007. Telephones are much more accessible in urban areas, with less than a quarter of land lines being in rural areas.

Science and technology

Research trends 
Malawi devoted 1.06% of GDP to research and development in 2010, according to a survey by the Department of Science and Technology, one of the highest ratios in Africa. This corresponds to $7.8 per researcher (in current purchasing parity dollars).

In 2014, Malawian scientists had the third-largest output in Southern Africa, in terms of articles cataloged in international journals. They published 322 articles in Thomson Reuters' Web of Science (Science Citation Index expanded) that year, almost triple the number in 2005 (116). Only South Africa (9,309) and the United Republic of Tanzania (770) published more in Southern Africa. Malawian scientists publish more in mainstream journals – relative to GDP – than any other country of similar population size. This is impressive, even if the country's publication density remains modest, with just 19 publications per million inhabitants cataloged in international journals in 2014. The average for sub-Saharan Africa is 20 publications per million inhabitants. Malawi was ranked 107th in the Global Innovation Index in 2021, up from 118th in 2019.

Policy framework 
Malawi's first science and technology policy dates from 1991 and was revised in 2002. The National Science and Technology Policy of 2002 envisaged the establishment of a National Commission for Science and Technology to advise the government and other stakeholders on science and technology-led development. Although the Science and Technology Act of 2003 made provision for the creation of this commission, it only became operational in 2011, with a secretariat resulting from the merger of the Department of Science and Technology and the National Research Council. The Science and Technology Act of 2003 also established a Science and Technology Fund to finance research and studies through government grants and loans but, this was not yet operational. The Secretariat of the National Commission for Science and Technology has reviewed the Strategic Plan for Science, Technology, and Innovation (2011–2015) but, as of early 2015, the revised policy had not yet met with Cabinet approval.

Malawi is conscious of the need to attract more foreign investment to foster technology transfer, develop human capital and empower the private sector to drive economic growth. In 2012, most foreign investments flowed to infrastructure (62%) and the energy sector (33%). The government has introduced a series of fiscal incentives, including tax breaks, to attract more foreign investors. In 2013, the Malawi Investment and Trade Centre put together an investment portfolio spanning 20 companies in the country's six major economic growth sectors, namely:
 agriculture;
 manufacturing;
 energy (bio-energy, mobile electricity);
tourism (ecolodges);
 infrastructure (wastewater services, fiber optic cables, etc.); and
 mining.

In 2013, the government adopted a National Export Strategy to diversify the country's exports. Production facilities are to be established for a wide range of products within the three selected clusters: oilseed products, sugar cane products, and manufacturing. The government estimates that these three clusters have the potential to represent more than 50% of Malawi's exports by 2027. In order to help companies adopt innovative practices and technologies, the strategy makes provision for greater access to the outcome of international research and better information about available technologies; it also helps companies to obtain grants to invest in such technologies from sources such as the country's Export Development Fund and the Malawi Innovation Challenge Fund.

The Malawi Innovation Challenge Fund is a competitive facility, through which businesses in Malawi's agricultural and manufacturing sectors can apply for grant funding for innovative projects with the potential for making a strong social impact and helping the country to diversify its narrow range of exports. The first round of competitive bidding opened in April 2014. The fund is aligned on the three clusters selected within the country's National Export Strategy: oilseed products, sugar cane products, and manufacturing. It provides a matching grant of up to 50% to innovative business projects to help absorb some of the commercial risks in triggering innovation. This support should speed up the implementation of new business models and/or the adoption of technologies. The fund is endowed with US$8 million from the United Nations Development Programme and the UK Department for International Development.

Achievements 

Among the notable achievements stemming from the implementation of national policies for science, technology and innovation in recent years are the:

 Establishment, in 2012, of the Malawi University of Science and Technology and the Lilongwe University of Agriculture and Natural Resources (LUANAR) to build STI capacity. LUANAR was delinked from the University of Malawi. This brings the number of public universities to four, with the University of Malawi and Mzuzu University;
 Improvement in biomedical research capacity through the five-year Health Research Capacity Strengthening Initiative (2008–2013) awarding research grants and competitive scholarships at Ph.D., master's and first-degree levels, supported by the UK Wellcome Trust and DfID;
 Strides made in conducting cotton confined field trials, with support from the US Program for Biosafety Systems, Monsanto, and LUANAR;
 Introduction of ethanol fuel as an alternative fuel to petrol and the adoption of ethanol technology;
 Launch of the Information and Communication Technology (ICT) Policy for Malawi in December 2013, to drive the deployment of ICTs in all economic and productive sectors and improve ICT infrastructure in rural areas, especially via the establishment of telecentres; and
 A review of secondary school curricula in 2013.

Demographics

Malawi has a population of over  million, with a growth rate of 3.32%, according to  estimates. The population is forecast to grow to over 45 million people by 2050, nearly tripling the estimated 16 million in 2010. Malawi's estimated 2016 population is, based on most recent estimates, 18,091,575.

Ethnic groups

Malawi's population is made up of the Chewa, Tumbuka, Yao, Lomwe, Sena, Tonga, Ngoni, and Ngonde native ethnic groups, as well as populations of Chinese and Europeans.

Languages

The official language is English. Major languages include Chichewa, a language spoken by over 41% of the population, Chitumbuka (28.2%) Chinyanja (12.8%), and Chiyao (16.1%). Other native languages are Malawian Lomwe, spoken by around 250,000 in the southeast of the country; Kokola, spoken by around 200,000 people also in the southeast; Lambya, spoken by around 45,000 in the northwestern tip; Ndali, spoken by around 70,000; Nyakyusa-Ngonde, spoken by around 300,000 in northern Malawi; Malawian Sena, spoken by around 270,000 in southern Malawi; and Tonga, spoken by around 170,000 in the north.

All students in public elementary school receive instruction in Chichewa, which is described as the unofficial national language of Malawi. Students in private elementary schools, however, receive instruction in English if they follow the American or British curriculum.

Religion

Malawi is a majority Christian country, with a significant Muslim minority. Government surveys indicate that 87% of the country is Christian, with a minority 11.6% Muslim population. The largest Christian groups in Malawi are the Roman Catholic Church, of which 19% of Malawians are adherents, and the Church of Central Africa Presbyterian (CCAP) to which 18% belong. The CCAP is the largest Protestant denomination in Malawi with 1.3 million members. There are smaller Presbyterian denominations like the Reformed Presbyterian Church of Malawi and the Evangelical Presbyterian Church of Malawi. There are also smaller numbers of Anglicans, Baptists, evangelicals, Seventh-day Adventists, and the Lutherans.

Most of the Muslim population is Sunni, of either the Qadriya or Sukkutu groups, with a few who follow the Ahmadiyya.

Other religious groups within the country include Jehovah's Witnesses (over 95,000), The Church of Jesus Christ of Latter-day Saints with just over 2,000 members in the country at the end of 2015, Rastafari, Hindus, Baháʼís, (0.2%) and around 300 Jews. Atheists make up around 4% of the population, although this number may include people who practice traditional African religions that do not have any gods.

Health

Malawi has central hospitals, regional and private facilities. The public sector offers free health services and medicines, while non-government organizations offers services and medicines for fees. Private doctors offer fee-based services and medicines. Health insurance schemes have been established since 2000. The country has a pharmaceutical manufacturing industry consisting of four privately owned pharmaceutical companies. Malawi's healthcare goal is for "promoting health, preventing, reducing and curing disease, and reducing the occurrence of premature death in the population".

Infant mortality rates are high, and life expectancy at birth is 50.03 years. Abortion is illegal in Malawi, except to save the mother's life. The Penal Code punishes women who seek illegal or clinical abortion with 7 years in prison, and 14 years for those perform the abortion. There is a high adult prevalence rate of HIV/AIDS, with an estimated 980,000 adults (or 9.1% of the population) living with the disease in 2015. There are approximately 27,000 deaths each year from HIV/AIDS, and over half a million children orphaned because of the disease (2015). Approximately 250 new people are infected each day, and at least 70% of Malawi's hospital beds are occupied by HIV/AIDS patients. The high rate of infection has resulted in an estimated 5.8% of the farm labour force dying of the disease. The government spends over $120,000 each year on funerals for civil servants who die of the disease. In 2006, international superstar Madonna started Raising Malawi, a foundation that helps AIDS orphans in Malawi, and also financed a documentary about the hardships experienced by Malawian orphans, called I Am Because We Are. Raising Malawi also works with the Millennium Villages Project to improve education, health care, infrastructure and agriculture in Malawi.

There is a very high degree of risk for major infectious diseases, including bacterial and protozoal diarrhoea, hepatitis A, typhoid fever, malaria, plague, schistosomiasis, and rabies. Malawi has been making progress on decreasing child mortality and reducing the incidences of HIV/AIDS, malaria and other diseases; however, the country has been "performing dismally" on reducing maternal mortality and promoting gender equality. Female genital mutilation (FGM), while not widespread, is practiced in some local communities.

On 23 November 2016, a court in Malawi sentenced an HIV-positive man to two years in prison with forced labour after having sex with 100 women without disclosing his status. Women rights activists asked the government to review the sentence calling it too "lenient". Some of the major health facilities in the country are Blantyre Adventist Hospital, Mwaiwathu Private Hospital, Queen Elizabeth Central, and Kamuzu Central Hospitals.

Education

In 1994, free primary education for all Malawian children was established by the government, and primary education has been compulsory since the passage of the Revised Education Act in 2012. As a result, attendance rates for all children have improved, with enrollment rates for primary schools up from 58% in 1992 to 75% in 2007. Also, the percentage of students who begin standard one and complete standard five has increased from 64% in 1992 to 86% in 2006. According to the World Bank, it shows that youth literacy had also increased from 68% in 2000 to 75% in 2015. This increase is primarily attributed to improved learning materials in schools, better infrastructure and feeding programs that have been implemented throughout the school system. However, attendance in the secondary school falls to approximately 25%, with attendance rates being slightly higher for males. Dropout rates are higher for girls than boys, attributed to security problems during long walks to school, as girls face a higher prevalence of gender-based violence.

Education in Malawi comprises eight years of primary education, four years of secondary school and four years of university. There are four public universities in Malawi: Mzuzu University (MZUNI), Lilongwe University of Agriculture and Natural Resources (LUANAR), the University of Malawi (UNIMA) and Malawi University of Science and Technology (MUST). There are also private universities, such as Livingstonia, Malawi Lakeview, Catholic University of Malawi, Central Christian University, African Bible College, UNICAF University, and MIM. The entry requirement is six credits on the Malawi School Certificate of Education, which is equivalent to O levels.

Women in Malawi 

The status of women throughout the world, including Malawi, is measured using a wide range of indices that cover areas of social, economic, and political contexts. Focusing primarily on the time period between 2010 and the current day, the status of women in Malawi will be analyzed through a range of statistical indices.

The current social status of women in Malawi is effectively estimated through indices such as female access to schooling, maternal mortality rate, and life expectancy of women from birth. These indices offer a wide lens of information on women's rights and life in Malawi. Women's access to schooling in Malawi as an index highlights how within the state, the ratio of male to female students for many age groups and for total students by gender shows women's access to schooling maintains on par with men's access. Female students in Malawi, though, see consistent declines as the age increases, signifying the failure of compulsory education amongst female students in Malawi. The life expectancy of women from birth in Malawi has seen significant growth over the past decade as the life expectancy of women in 2010 was approximately 58 years old whilst the most recent data from 2017 finds that women in Malawi's average life expectancy grew to 66 years. The maternal mortality rate in Malawi which is particularly low even when compared with states at similar points in the development process.

The economic status of women in Malawi is gauged using indices such as the inheritance rights for women, unemployment, and labour force participation for females, along with the extent of the wage gap present between men and women in the Malawian economy. The inheritance rights index gauges the ability of women to effectively own and maintain the property in comparison with their male counterparts. The current inheritance rights in Malawi are found to be equal in their dispersion between male/female children and for male/female surviving spouses. Contrary to the equality found in inheritance rights in Malawi, labour force participation and unemployment highlight the challenges for female employment in the state. The current state of female labour participation details how a higher percentage of the male population is currently employed despite the female population having a higher total employed population and a very similar unemployment rate. This gap continues with wages in Malawi as the state continues to score towards the bottom of the list when compared to states across the world. Along with their poor international ranking, the state scores poorly when compared to other sub-Saharan countries as the highest-ranked sub-Saharan state, Rwanda, scored a 0.791 on a 0–1 scale while Malawi scored 0.664.

The indices used to gauge the political status of women include political participation amongst women, access to political institutions, and female seats in the national parliament. The political participation of women in Malawi as an index is effectively captured through a myriad of sources; these sources come to similar conclusions in regards to the political participation of women. The participation of women in the national political structure has been shown to be weaker than their male counterparts due to the normalization of negative stereotypes which women are not expected to be as politically active as men. The female participation in politics is further restricted from national political structures due to the presence of gatekeepers which provide access to the resources needed to win elections and maintain seats in parliament. This limited participation is directly correlated to the limited positions which are occupied by women in the national setup. This setup, despite its commitment to equal positions for men and women, has failed to promote methods for female politicians maintaining their seats in parliament and as a result of said policies, women throughout Malawi are left without the proper structure and resources to maintain their position in the national structure. Despite the limited resources available to these female politicians, the national parliament within Malawi finds reasonable success in appointing female members to seats within the body as over 20% of the seats in parliament are held by women. Despite the limited access and resources widely available for female politicians in Malawi, the state is finding reasonable success in promoting female politicians on the national scene which works in conjunction with the positive trajectory of the social and economic indices to conclude that Malawi should expect continued growth toward gender equality.

Military

Malawi maintains a small standing military of approximately 25,000, the Malawian Defence Force. It consists of army, navy and air force elements. The Malawi army originated from British colonial units formed before independence, and is now made up of two rifle regiments and one parachute regiment. The Malawi Air Force was established with German help in 1976, and operates a small number of transport aircraft and multi-purpose helicopters. The Malawian Navy was established in the early 1970s with Portuguese support, presently having three vessels operating on Lake Malawi, based in Monkey Bay. In 2017, Malawi signed the UN treaty on the Prohibition of Nuclear Weapons.

Culture

The name "Malawi" comes from the Maravi, a Bantu ethnic group who emigrated from the southern Congo around 1400 AD. Upon reaching northern Lake Malawi, the group divided, with one group moving south down the west bank of the lake to become the group known as the Chewa, while the other group, the ancestors of today's Nyanja, moved along the east side of the lake to the southern section of Malawi. Ethnic conflict and continuing migration prevented the formation of a society that was uniquely and cohesively Malawian until the dawn of the 20th century. Over the past century, ethnic distinctions have diminished to the point where there is no significant inter-ethnic friction, although regional divisions still occur. The concept of a Malawian nationality has begun to form around predominantly rural people who are generally conservative and traditionally nonviolent. The "Warm Heart of Africa" nickname is not due to the hot weather of the country, but due to the kind, loving nature of the Malawian people.

From 1964 to 2010, and again since 2012, the Flag of Malawi is made up of three equal horizontal stripes of black, red, and green with a red rising sun superimposed in the center of the black stripe. The black stripe represented the African people, the red represented the blood of martyrs for African freedom, green represented Malawi's ever-green nature and the rising sun represented the dawn of freedom and hope for Africa. In 2010, the flag was changed, removing the red rising sun and adding a full white sun in the centre as a symbol of Malawi's economic progress. The change was reverted in 2012.

Its dances are a strong part of Malawi's culture, and the National Dance Troupe (formerly the Kwacha Cultural Troupe) was formed in November 1987 by the government. Traditional music and dances can be seen at initiation rites, rituals, marriage ceremonies and celebrations.

The indigenous ethnic groups of Malawi have a rich tradition of basketry and mask carving, and some of these goods are used in traditional ceremonies still performed by native peoples. Wood carving and oil painting are also popular in more urban centres, with many of the items produced being sold to tourists. There are several internationally recognised literary figures from Malawi, including poet Jack Mapanje, history and fiction writer Paul Zeleza and authors Legson Kayira, Felix Mnthali, Frank Chipasula and David Rubadiri. https://malawithebeautiful.com

Sports

Football is the most common sport in Malawi, introduced there during British colonial rule. Its national team has failed to qualify for a World Cup so far, but have made two appearances in the Africa Cup of Nations. Football teams include Mighty Wanderers, Big Bullets, Silver Strikers, Blue Eagles, Civo Sporting, Moyale Barracks, and Mighty Tigers.
Basketball is also growing in popularity, but its national team is yet to participate in any international competition.

More success has been found in netball, with the Malawi national netball team ranked 6th in the world (as of March 2021). Notably a number of players in the national team play in international leagues.

Cuisine
Malawian cuisine is diverse, with tea and fish being popular features of the country's cuisine. Sugar, coffee, corn, potatoes, sorghum, cattle and goats are also important components of the cuisine and economy. Lake Malawi is a source of fish including chambo (similar to bream), usipa (similar to sardines), and mpasa (similar to salmon and kampango). Nsima is a food staple made from ground corn and typically served with side dishes of meat and vegetables. It is commonly eaten for lunch and dinner.

See also

 Outline of Malawi
 Telephone numbers in Malawi

Notes

References

External links

 Government of the Republic of Malawi Official website
 

 
Republics in the Commonwealth of Nations
East African countries
Southeast African countries
Southern African countries
English-speaking countries and territories
Landlocked countries
Least developed countries
Member states of the African Union
Member states of the Commonwealth of Nations
Member states of the United Nations
States and territories established in 1964
1964 establishments in Malawi
Countries in Africa